Chalrang is a village in the Champhai district of Mizoram, India. It is located in the Khawzawl R.D. Block.

182km far away from state Capital Aizawl (City of Mizoram).

Demographics 

According to the 2011 census of India, Chalrang has 137 households. The effective literacy rate (i.e. the literacy rate of population excluding children aged 6 and below) is 98.1%.

References 

Villages in Khawzawl block